No One Else Can Wear Your Crown is the third studio album by London-based alt-pop duo Oh Wonder, released through Island Records on 7 February 2020. It was preceded by the release of the singles "Hallelujah", "Better Now", "I Wish I Never Met You" and "Happy". The duo will embark on a world tour in support of the album in March and April 2020.

Background and recording
Oh Wonder wrote and recorded the album at their home studio, and it was co-mixed by Cenzo Townshend.

Track listing
All tracks produced by Oh Wonder, except for "How it Goes" and "Drunk on You", produced alongside Starsmith.

Charts

References

2020 albums
Oh Wonder albums
Island Records albums